Gary Tuchman is a reporter on the American cable news channel CNN.

Early life and education
Tuchman's father, Ronald E. Tuchman, was CEO of Child World, which was the 2nd largest toy store in the US at the time.

Tuchman gained a Bachelor of Science degree in broadcast journalism at Boston University.

Career
Before joining CNN in 1990, Tuchman worked for five years as an anchor and reporter at CBS-affiliated WPEC (TV) in West Palm Beach, Florida, where he specialized in political reporting.

Currently, he is a staff correspondent for the news show Anderson Cooper 360°.

Tuchman's daughter Lindsay is following in her father's footsteps, starting her career at WBOC-TV in Salisbury, Maryland. This is the same station where her father started.

Personal life
In 1990, Tuchman married Katherine M. Stark in a Jewish ceremony at the Waldorf-Astoria in Manhattan.

Notes

External links
Gary Tuchman at CNN's website

CNN people
American television reporters and correspondents
Living people
Year of birth missing (living people)